Duan Yixuan (born August 19, 1995 in Chenzhou, Hunan, central southern part of China) is a Chinese singer and actress, and member of Chinese idol group SNH48, of which she is the Captain of Team SII.

Career
On July 25, 2015, during SNH48's second General Election, Duan was announced as one of the fifth-generation members of SNH48. On December 4, she made her first public performance during Team XII's first stage, "Theater no Megami". On December 26, she participated in SNH48's second Request Time.

On April 20, 2016, Duan was transferred to BEJ48, and became part of Team B. On April 29, she made her stage debut as a BEJ48 member during Team B's first stage, "Theater no Megami". On May 20, she became part of the senbatsu for SNH48's twelfth EP, "Dream Land". On July 30, during SNH48's third General Election, she was ranked 43rd with 12477.2 votes, meanwhile she came in second within BEJ48, becoming part of BEJ48's Top 7. On September 15, she was appointed captain of Team B.

On January 7, 2017, Duan participated in SNH48's third Request Time. On March 4, she was voted as BEJ48 Annual Theater MVP for the year 2016. On July 29, during SNH48's fourth General Election, Duan came in 13th with 46825.4 votes, at the same time she became the top member in BEJ48. As such, she held the center position on BEJ48's fourth EP, "Variety Exclamation Mark", released on September 30.

On January 12, 2018, Duan took on her first leading role in time-traveling web drama A Journey to Tang. Starting May 6, she served as a Chinese commentator for the first semi-final of Eurovision Song Contest 2018. On July 28, she came in 15th with 53190.64 votes during SNH48 Group's fifth General Election, becoming part of the senbatsu.

On April 20, 2019, Duan resigned as captain of Team B. On July 27, during SNH48 Group's sixth General Election, she was ranked third, becoming the first sister group member to rank among the top three.

On March 12, 2020, Duan participated in Youth With You (Idol Producer Season 3).

On September 4, 2020, due to prolonged closure of the BEJ48 theatre, Duan relocated to Shanghai and joined Team SII of SNH48.

Discography

With BEJ48

EPs

With SNH48

EPs

Units

Stage Units

Concert units

Filmography

Web series

Others

References

External links
 Official Member Profile 
 

1995 births
Living people
People from Chenzhou
BEJ48 members
Youth With You contestants
Chinese idols
21st-century Chinese women singers
21st-century Chinese singers
Chinese television actresses
21st-century Chinese actresses